The Deming Main Post Office, at 201 W. Spruce St. in Deming, New Mexico, was built in 1937.  It was listed on the National Register of Historic Places in 1990 as U.S. Post Office--Deming Main.

Its Classical Revival design is attributed to Louis A. Simon.

The interior includes a mural painted by artist Kenneth Adams in 1938, funded by a New Deal public arts program.  The  mural shows a landscape typical of the Deming area.

The property is listed for its information potential  as well as for its architecture.

See also
List of post office murals

References

External links

Post office buildings in New Mexico
National Register of Historic Places in Luna County, New Mexico
Neoclassical architecture in New Mexico
Government buildings completed in 1937